The 1989 CCHA Men's Ice Hockey Tournament was the 18th CCHA Men's Ice Hockey Tournament. It was played between March 3 and March 11, 1989. First round games were played at campus sites, while 'final four' games were played at Joe Louis Arena in Detroit, Michigan. By winning the tournament, Michigan State received the Central Collegiate Hockey Association's automatic bid to the 1989 NCAA Division I Men's Ice Hockey Tournament.

Format
The tournament featured three rounds of play. The team that finished below eighth place in the standings was not eligible for postseason play. In the quarterfinals, the first and eighth seeds, the second and seventh seeds, the third seed and sixth seeds and the fourth seed and fifth seeds played a best-of-three series, with the winners advancing to the semifinals. In the semifinals, the remaining highest and lowest seeds and second highest and second lowest seeds play a single-game, with the winners advancing to the finals. The tournament champion receives an automatic bid to the 1989 NCAA Division I Men's Ice Hockey Tournament.

Conference standings
Note: GP = Games played; W = Wins; L = Losses; T = Ties; PTS = Points; GF = Goals For; GA = Goals Against

Bracket

Note: * denotes overtime period(s)

First round

(1) Michigan State vs. (8) Ohio State

(2) Lake Superior State vs. (7) Ferris State

(3) Illinois–Chicago vs. (6) Western Michigan

(4) Michigan vs. (5) Bowling Green

Semifinals

(1) Michigan State vs. (5) Bowling Green

(2) Lake Superior State vs. (3) Illinois–Chicago

Consolation Game

(3) Illinois–Chicago vs. (5) Bowling Green

Championship

(1) Michigan State vs. (2) Lake Superior State

Tournament awards

All-Tournament Team
F Anthony Palumbo (Lake Superior State)
F Sheldon Gorski (Illinois–Chicago)
F Bobby Reynolds (Michigan State)
D Dan Keczmer (Lake Superior State)
D Brad Hamilton (Michigan State)
G Jason Muzzatti* (Michigan State)
* Most Valuable Player(s)

References

External links
CCHA Champions
1988–89 CCHA Standings
1988–89 NCAA Standings

CCHA Men's Ice Hockey Tournament
Ccha tournament